The 2014 Windward Islands Tournament was an international football tournament between the Windward Islands nations which was hosted by Dominica between 30 April and 4 May 2014. Saint Lucia was crowned champion.

Squads

Fixtures
All times are local (UTC-4)

Table

Goal scorers

References

Windward
Windward Islands Tournament
2014 in Dominica sport
Football competitions in Dominica